Jackie's Bag is an album by American saxophonist Jackie McLean recorded in 1959 and 1960 and released by Blue Note. It features three tracks with McLean in a quintet featuring trumpeter Donald Byrd, pianist Sonny Clark, bassist Paul Chambers and drummer Philly Joe Jones, and six tracks with a sextet featuring tenor saxophonist Tina Brooks, trumpeter Blue Mitchell, pianist Kenny Drew, bassist Paul Chambers and drummer Art Taylor.

Reception
The contemporaneous DownBeat reviewer stated that "All the participants play well, and the thematic content, all McLean's work, is interesting", but added that he preferred McLean's earlier, more intense playing. The AllMusic review by Steve Huey stated: "the music on Jackie's Bag finds McLean in a staunchly hard bop mode, with occasional hints of adventurousness".

Track listing
All compositions by Jackie McLean, except as indicated.

 "Quadrangle"4:44
 "Blues Inn"9:06
 "Fidel"7:11
 "Appointment in Ghana"6:59
 "A Ballad for Doll"3:19
 "Isle of Java" (Tina Brooks)7:31

Bonus tracks on CD reissue:
"Street Singer" (Brooks)10:19
 "Melonae's Dance"6:50
 "Medina" (Brooks)6:48

Recorded on January 18, 1959 (tracks 1–3) and September 1, 1960 (tracks 4–9).

Personnel
Tracks 1–3
Jackie McLeanalto saxophone
Donald Byrdtrumpet
Sonny Clarkpiano (#2–3)
Paul Chambersbass
Philly Joe Jonesdrums

Tracks 4–9
Jackie McLeanalto saxophone
Tina Brookstenor saxophone
Blue Mitchelltrumpet
Kenny Drewpiano
Paul Chambersbass
Art Taylordrums

References

Blue Note Records albums
Jackie McLean albums
1961 albums
Albums produced by Alfred Lion
Albums recorded at Van Gelder Studio